Collyer is a city in Trego County, Kansas, United States.  As of the 2020 census, the population of the city was 97.  It is located approximately 12 miles west of WaKeeney.

History
The first settlement was made at Collyer in 1879. Collyer was named for Rev. Robert Collyer.

Geography
Collyer is located at  (39.036947, -100.117451).

Climate
The climate in this area is characterized by hot, humid summers and generally mild to cool winters.  According to the Köppen Climate Classification system, Collyer has a humid subtropical climate, abbreviated "Cfa" on climate maps.

Demographics

2010 census
As of the census of 2010, there were 109 people, 49 households, and 34 families residing in the city. The racial makeup of the city was 100.0% White. Hispanic or Latino of any race were 0.9% of the population.

There were 49 households, of which 16.3% had children under the age of 18 living with them, 55.1% were married couples living together, 8.2% had a female householder with no husband present, 6.1% had a male householder with no wife present, and 30.6% were non-families. 26.5% of all households were made up of individuals, and 12.2% had someone living alone who was 65 years of age or older. The average household size was 2.22 and the average family size was 2.71.

The median age in the city was 47.8 years. 12.8% of residents were under the age of 18; 12.8% were between the ages of 18 and 24; 20.1% were from 25 to 44; 32.1% were from 45 to 64; and 22% were 65 years of age or older. The gender makeup of the city was 53.2% male and 46.8% female.

2000 census
As of the census of 2000, there were 133 people, 59 households, and 35 families residing in the city. The racial makeup of the city was 97.74% White and 2.26% Native American. Hispanic or Latino of any race were 0.75% of the population.

There were 59 households, out of which 28.8% had children under the age of 18 living with them, 54.2% were married couples living together, 3.4% had a female householder with no husband present, and 39.0% were non-families. 37.3% of all households were made up of individuals, and 22.0% had someone living alone who was 65 years of age or older. The average household size was 2.25 and the average family size was 2.97.

In the city, the population was spread out, with 26.3% under the age of 18, 1.5% from 18 to 24, 33.1% from 25 to 44, 18.0% from 45 to 64, and 21.1% who were 65 years of age or older. The median age was 40 years. For every 100 females, there were 114.5 males. For every 100 females age 18 and over, there were 96.0 males.

The median income for a household in the city was $24,167, and the median income for a family was $35,313. Males had a median income of $27,708 versus $20,833 for females. The per capita income for the city was $11,346. There were 25.8% of families and 19.4% of the population living below the poverty line, including 9.3% of under eighteens and 30.0% of those over 64.

Education
Collyer High School closed in 1966. The Collyer High School mascot was Collyer Wildcats.

References

Further reading

External links

 Collyer - Directory of Public Officials
 USD 208, local school district
 Collyer city map, KDOT

Cities in Kansas
Cities in Trego County, Kansas